The 2023 PBA Governors' Cup, also known as the 2023 Honda PBA Governors' Cup for sponsorship reasons,  is the third and final conference of the 2022–23 PBA season of the Philippine Basketball Association (PBA). The 21st edition of the Governors' Cup started on January 22, 2023, and will end in April. The tournament allows teams to hire foreign players or imports with a height limit of 6 feet 6 inches (1.98 m).

Format
The following format will be observed for the duration of the conference:
 Single round-robin eliminations; 11 games per team; Teams are then seeded by basis on win–loss records.
Top eight teams will advance to the quarterfinals. In case of tie, a playoff game will be held only for the #8 seed.
Quarterfinals:
QF1: #1 vs #8 (#1 twice-to-beat)
QF2: #2 vs #7 (#2 twice-to-beat)
QF3: #3 vs #6 (#3 twice-to-beat)
QF4: #4 vs #5 (#4 twice-to-beat)
Semifinals (best-of-5 series):
SF1: QF1 winner vs. QF4 winner
SF2: QF2 winner vs. QF3 winner
Finals (best-of-7 series)
F1: SF1 winner vs SF2 winner

Elimination round

Team standings

Schedule

Results

Bracket

Quarterfinals
All match-ups have the higher-seeded team having the twice-to-beat advantage, where they have to be beaten twice, and their opponents just once, to advance.

(1) TNT vs. (8) Phoenix Super LPG

(2) San Miguel vs. (7) Converge

(3) Barangay Ginebra vs. (6) NLEX

(4) Meralco vs. (5) Magnolia

Semifinals
All match-ups are best-of-five playoffs.

(2) San Miguel vs. (3) Barangay Ginebra

Imports 
The following is the list of imports, which had played for their respective teams at least once, with the returning imports in italics. Highlighted are the imports who stayed with their respective teams for the whole conference.

Awards

Players of the Week

Statistics

Individual statistical leaders

Local players

Import players

Individual game highs

Local players

Import players

Team statistical leaders

Notes

References

Governors' Cup
PBA Governors' Cup